The Presbyterian Church in Korea (HapDongChongShin) was an offspring of the Presbyterian Church in Korea (HapDongJinRi). It was founded in 1985. The church had 100 congregations and 12,000 members in 2004. It affirms the Apostles Creed and Westminster Confession.

References 

Presbyterian denominations in South Korea